Glasgow is an unincorporated community in Coos County, Oregon, United States. For statistical purposes, the United States Census Bureau has defined Glasgow as a census-designated place (CDP). The census definition of the area may not precisely correspond to local understanding of the area with the same name. As of the 2010 census the Glasgow CDP had a population of 763. The place name for Glasgow in the Coos language is Kdet.

The community was founded by real estate speculators in the 1890s, including Henry L. Pittock, Phil Metschan, and Admiral Schley of the Pacific Coal & Transportation Company. The community did not flourish until 30 years after its founding, when construction of Route 101 made Glasgow the northern terminus of the ferry from North Bend, which was used to cross the bay prior to the completion of the Coos Bay Bridge.  The place was supposedly named by a Scot because it reminded him of Glasgow, Scotland, but the authors of Oregon Geographic Names were unable to verify this.

Glasgow has a store and a Grange hall, the North Bayside Grange, also known as the Glasgow Grange, that was built in 1928. A humorous sign at the store states that the community's population is "275.5", the .5 for store owner and "self-proclaimed mayor", Jack S. Stevens.

Demographics

References

External links
Images of Glasgow from Flickr

Census-designated places in Oregon
Census-designated places in Coos County, Oregon
Unincorporated communities in Coos County, Oregon
Unincorporated communities in Oregon